Salem 66 was an American indie-rock group formed in 1982 by Judy Grunwald, Elisabeth Kaplan and Susan Merriam. At the time, a serious almost-all-female rock band was somewhat unusual. Through the band's existence, it added and subtracted members, including Robert Wilson Rodriguez, Stephen Smith, Tim Condon, and Jim Vincent. Salem 66 lasted until 1989 and was an important part of the Boston alternative indie music scene. They recorded and released records on Homestead Records, a label founded by Gerard Cosloy. Their music was described as folk punk, but they could be called jangle pop and a loose association can be made with the Paisley Underground and groups such as R.E.M.

Discography
All recordings were released by Homestead Records:
1984 - Salem 66 - Six-song 12" EP
1984 - "Across the Sea" b/w "Pony Song" - vinyl 7" 45rpm single
1985 - "Love & Truth" b/w "Primavera" - vinyl 7" 45rpm single
1985 - A Ripping Spin - vinyl LP
1987 - Frequency and Urgency - vinyl LP
1988 - Natural Disasters, National Treasures - vinyl LP, CD
1990 - Down the Primrose Path - vinyl LP, CD

In 1987, Homestead released Your Soul Is Mine, Fork It Over, an 18-song retrospective CD combining selections from all the vinyl-only releases.

See also 
 Homestead Records

References

External links

  Trouser Press: Salem 66''
 New England Music Scrapbook: Salem 66"

Musical groups established in 1982
Homestead Records artists
Indie rock musical groups from Massachusetts
Musical groups from Boston
1982 establishments in the United States